The National Volleyball Association (NVA) is a professional indoor volleyball league in the United States. The league comprises 12 teams and is one of the top-level sports leagues below the major leagues amongst lacrosse, rugby, and indoor soccer. It has become one of the premier men's professional leagues globally, holding the best talent that the United States has to offer.

The league was founded in Costa Mesa, California, in 2017. The NVA's regular season runs from March to August, with each team playing nine games during the regular season. As of 2021, NVA players became the first volleyball athletes to have paid salaries in a Men's American Volleyball league outside of Puerto Rico.

The NVA is an active partner with the American Volleyball Coaches Association (AVCA), which collaborates with the NCAA (National Collegiate Athletic Association) and the Olympic team. The league office and some individual team offices operate out of NVA's headquarters in Costa Mesa.

NVA's 2020 season was postponed due to COVID-19 pandemic.

In 2021, two new teams joined the league. The Chicago Untouchables and the Dallas Tornadoes.

Then in 2022, the Seattle Sasquatch and Colorado Kraken brought the league to a total of 12 teams.

The Las Veags Ramblers are the reigning champions, beating the OC Stunners 3–0 in the 2022 NVA Championship Cup Finals.

Teams
National Volleyball Association's 12 teams are divided between the National and American Conferences.

Regular season 

The upcoming 2022 regular season will start between March and April and goes through to July. Each team plays ten games at different exhibition locations, including the Inland Empire Matador's home gym at Pearce Sport's Center in San Bernardino. A team faces each of its opponents in its division two times a year (four games). Each team plays the three teams from the other division in their conference (American or National Conference) and then another three teams from one division in the opposing conference (six games). This asymmetrical structure means the strength of schedule will vary between teams. Over the seasons, each team will have played seven games against their conference and three from their opposing conference.

Playoffs 
The NVA Cup Championship playoffs begin in August after the regular season with the top four teams in each conference, regardless of divisional alignment. Seeds are awarded in strict order of the regular-season record (with the FIVB point system to decide tiebreakers as needed). The playoffs follow a single-elimination tournament format. Losers from the semi-finals matches are eliminated from the championship match but play in the bronze medal match. The winner of the NVA Finals receives the NVA Cup Trophy. In addition, the league awards the Most Valuable Player Award to the best performing player of the championship event and seven awards for the best performing player of each position during the regular season.

Champions

Total titles

See also
Athletes Unlimited Volleyball (AUV)
International Volleyball Association
Volleyball in the United States

References

External links
 National Volleyball Association
 USA Volleyball

Volleyball organizations
Volleyball competitions in the United States
National Volleyball Association
Sports leagues established in 2018
Professional sports leagues in the United States